Ptychandra ohtanii is a butterfly of the family Nymphalidae. It is endemic to the Philippines. Its forewing length is 26–29 mm. The species resembles P. lorquinii. Black hair-pencil is arising in space 3 of forewing upperside in P. ohtanii whereas arising on cubitus in P. lorquinii. The nominotypical subspecies is distributed only on Mount Apo on Mindanao island. Another subspecies is found on Leyte island. The species is rare on both islands.

Subspecies
Ptychandra ohtanii ohtanii H. Hayashi, [1978]
Ptychandra ohtanii lizae H. Hayashi, [1984] (Leyte)

References

 , 1978: Three new species of Ptychandra from Mt. Apo, Mindanao (Lepidoptera: Nymphalidae). Tyô to Ga. 29(4): 211-214.
 , 1982. In Tsukada, E.(Ed.), Butterflies of the South East Asian Islands, 3. 500pp., incl. 113pls. Plapac. Tokyo.
 , 1995. Checklist of the butterflies of the Philippine Islands (Lepidoptera: Rhopalocera) Nachrichten des Entomologischen Vereins Apollo Suppl.14: 7-118.
 , 2006: Additional notes on the satyrid butterflies after publication of "Butterflies of the South East Asian Islands Part3 Satyridae-Libytheidae". Butterflies. 43: 16-29.
, 2012. Revised checklist of the butterflies of the Philippine Islands (Lepidoptera: Rhopalocera) Nachrichten des Entomologischen Vereins Apollo Suppl.20: 1-64.

Butterflies described in 1978
Satyrinae